Sema Acarturk (born ) is a Turkish female weightlifter, competing in the 53 kg category and representing Turkey at international competitions. She competed at world championships, most recently at the 2015 World Weightlifting Championships.

Major results

References

1993 births
Living people
Turkish female weightlifters
Place of birth missing (living people)
21st-century Turkish sportswomen